Charles Rodwell (born 26 June 1996) is a French politician from Agir.

Early life 
Rodwell was born in London, England to a British father and French mother.

Political career 
Rodwell was elected to the National Assembly in Yvelines's 1st constituency in the 2022 French legislative election.

See also 

 List of deputies of the 16th National Assembly of France

References 

Living people
1996 births
French people of English descent
21st-century French politicians
21st-century French politicians subcats
La République En Marche! politicians

Deputies of the 16th National Assembly of the French Fifth Republic
Alumni of the London School of Economics
Agir (France) politicians
Members of Parliament for Yvelines